Kessleria nivosa is a moth of the family Yponomeutidae. It is found in China (Yunnan).

References

Moths described in 1938
Yponomeutidae